Northern Province or North Province may refer to:

North Province (Cameroon), known as North Region from 2008
Far North Province, Cameroon, known as Far North Region from 2008
North Kazakhstan Province
Northern Province, Rwanda, created January 2006
North Province, Maldives
North Province, New Caledonia
Northern Province, Papua New Guinea, also known as Oro Province (redirects)
Northern Province, Sierra Leone
Northern Province, Sri Lanka
Northern Province (Victoria), a former electorate in the Victorian Legislative Council (Australia)
North Province (Western Australia), a former electorate in the Western Australian Legislative Council
Northern Province, Zambia
Limpopo province, South Africa, formerly known as Northern Province
Northern Cape province, South Africa, part of the former Cape Province
Uttar Pradesh, India (Hindi: Uttar = North, Pradesh = province/region/state)
 North Sumatra (Sumatra Utara) - a province in Indonesia
 North Sulawesi (Sulawesi Utara) - a province in Indonesia
 North Maluku (Maluku Utara) - a province in Indonesia
Province of York, an ecclesiastical province of the Church of England

In fiction, "North Province" may refer to:
The predecessor state of North Kingdom in the World of Greyhawk campaign setting for the Dungeons & Dragons roleplaying game.

See also 
 Northern Provinces, an area used in the World Geographic Scheme for Recording Plant Distributions

Province name disambiguation pages